WBYZ (94.5 FM) is a radio station in Baxley, in the U.S. State of Georgia. WBYZ is branded as "Z-94.5 FM" and is sister to WUFE-AM. WBYZ-FM is operated by Al Graham and his family.

The station was once associated with O'Quinn Broadcasting.  O'Quinn owned the Big Wolf chain of stations.  Station WUFF is still in operation in Eastman, Georgia.

External links
WBYZ Online

BYZ
Radio stations established in 1979
1979 establishments in Georgia (U.S. state)